Joanne T. Twomey is a Maine politician. Twomey, a Democrat, represented part of Biddeford (District 135) from 1998 to 2006. She served on the agriculture, conservation and forestry; natural resources; engrossed bills committees, including a stint as chair of the engrossed bills. Twomey was elected Mayor of Biddeford in 2006 and was re-elected in 2008 and 2010. In November 2011, Twomey was defeated for re-election by State Representative Alan Casavant.

On April 2, 2015, Twomey was ejected from a public meeting in Saco after she tossed a jar of Vaseline onstage after heated comments regarding Maine's budget. This was in response to LePage's previous comments in 2013 that "Democratic state Sen. Troy Jackson claims to be for the people, but he's the first one to give it to the people without providing Vaseline."

References

Year of birth missing (living people)
Living people
Mayors of Biddeford, Maine
Democratic Party members of the Maine House of Representatives
Women mayors of places in Maine
Women state legislators in Maine
21st-century American women